Nono Pongolo (born 18 August 1989) is a South African first class cricketer. He was included in the Gauteng cricket team for the 2015 Africa T20 Cup. In September 2018, he was named in Gauteng's squad for the 2018 Africa T20 Cup. In September 2019, he was named in the squad for the Jozi Stars team for the 2019 Mzansi Super League tournament. Later the same month, he was named as the captain of Gauteng's squad for the 2019–20 CSA Provincial T20 Cup. In April 2021, he was named in North West's squad, ahead of the 2021–22 cricket season in South Africa.

References

External links
 

1989 births
Living people
People from the City of Cape Town
Cricketers from Cape Town
South African cricketers
Gauteng cricketers
Lions cricketers
Jozi Stars cricketers
North West cricketers